Petroșani (Hungarian: Petrozsény; German: Petroschen) is a city in Hunedoara County, Transylvania, Romania, with a population of 34,331 (2011). The city has been associated with mining since the 19th century.

History

"Pietros" means "stony, rocky" in Romanian. The city of Petroșani was founded in the 17th century (around 1640) with the name Petrozsény. In 1720, an Austrian cartographer mentions that the entire Jiu Valley was intensely populated and settlements could be seen from one end to the other.

During the 1818 census, Petrozsény had 233 inhabitants, while the entire Valley counted 2,550. During this time, the main activity of the people was shepherding and no urban settlement had appeared yet.

Around 1840 coal surface mining began in Petrozsény, Vulkán (today Vulcan) and Petrilla (today Petrila).

Romanian troops attacked the town during the 1916 invasion of Transylvania. A battalion of miners defended Petrozsény in a last stand battle, refusing to give up the town. The Romanian occupation, however, did not last long: the united Austro-Hungarian and German troops liberated the town shortly, in which the guerrilla warfare, led by the local Viktor Maderspach, played an important role.

The town became part of Romania in 1920 as a consequence of the Treaty of Trianon. 

The population experienced massive growth only in the 20th century during the communist regime, as many workers were brought in from other parts of the country.

As other cities from the Jiu Valley, throughout the second half of the 19th century and most of the 20th century, most activities in the city revolved around the mines. But after the fall of the communist regime, many mines were closed, and the city, just like the whole valley, was forced to diversify the economy. This has also led to a significant population decline: Petroșani is one of the Romanian cities which has experienced the fastest population loss from the 1990s onwards.

Geography

Petroșani is located in the Jiu Valley, which is the entrance to the Retezat National Park and provides access to the Vâlcan, Parâng and Retezat mountains. The city administers four villages: Dâlja Mare (Nagydilzsa), Dâlja Mică (Kisdilzsa), Peștera (Zsupinyászuvölgy) and Slătinioara (Szlatinova községrész).

Landmarks
 Sfinții Arhangeli Church ("Holy Archangels Church"), built in the 18th century.
 The "I. G. Duca" school, built in 1935
 The Hungarian school - built in 1873 by Germans and inhabited by a group of 50 Catholic nuns from a monastery near Munich
 The Old Theater, built in 1886
 The Lutheran Church, built between 1892 and 1896
 The Mining Museum, built in 1920
 The actual Sports School building, built in 1919
 The "I. D. Sîrbu" Theater Hall, built in 1905
 The Justice Court building, built in 1910
 The actual Students theater, built in 1922
 The Unitarian Church, built between 1924 and 1928
 The University of Petroșani, built in 1948
 The Jiul Shopping Center, re-opened in December 2007 after renovation, initially built in the early 1980s

Social events
The following social events take place in Petroșani:
 the Dramatic Theater offers a wide variety of performance every week
 the annual international folklore festival
 the Folk Music Festival Cântecul Adâncului... ("Song of the Deep")
 artistic summer camps organized by the Petroșani University
 art, numismatic and caricatures exhibitions
 piano and violin recitals, offered by the Music School
 the Petroșani Days festival, usually organized in autumn
the annual Underground Valley Graffiti Fest

Demographics

In 1850, Petroșani was a small village, the vast majority of its 581 inhabitants being Romanian.
According to the 1910 census, from 12,193 inhabitants 7,748 (63.54%) were Hungarian, 3,250 Romanian (26.65%) and 831 (6.82%) German.

At the 2011 census, 90.59% of inhabitants were Romanians, 6.54% Hungarians, 1.82% Roma, and 0.35% Germans. At the 2002 census, 83.3% were Romanian Orthodox, 7.2% Roman Catholic, 3.7% Reformed, 2.2% Pentecostal, 0.9% belonged to another religion and 0.8% Greek-Catholic.

Notable people
 Cristina Adela Foișor, international chess master
 Călin Peter Netzer, film director

Gallery

References

External links

 
 Jiu Valley Portal - the regional portal host of the official Petroșani municipal website

 
Populated places in Hunedoara County
Localities in Transylvania
Jiu Valley
Cities in Romania
Monotowns in Romania